Notts County Football Club is a professional association football club based in Nottingham, England. The team participate in the National League, the fifth tier of the English football league system. Founded on 25 November 1862, it is the oldest professional association football club in the world and predates the Football Association itself. The club became one of the 12 founder members of the Football League in 1888. They are nicknamed the "Magpies" due to the black and white colour of their home strip, which inspired Italian club Juventus to adopt the colours for their kit in 1903. After playing at different home grounds during its first fifty years, including Trent Bridge, the club moved to Meadow Lane in 1910 and remains there. Notts County has a local rivalry with city neighbour Nottingham Forest, as well as with other nearby clubs such as Mansfield Town.

Notts County finished third in the top flight of English football in the 1890–91 season, which, together with the same achievement 10 seasons later, remains their highest ever league position. They also reached the 1891 FA Cup Final, finishing as runners-up to Blackburn Rovers. However three years later the club won the 1894 FA Cup Final with a 4–1 victory over Bolton Wanderers. From 1897 until 1920 they played in the First Division which was then the top flight, barring the 1913–14 season when they won the Second Division immediately following relegation the previous year. They won the Second Division for a third time in the 1922–23 campaign, before suffering relegations down to the Third Division South, which they won in their first attempt in 1930–31.

The club were back in the Third Division South by World War II, but were again promoted as champions in 1949–50 and spent most of the 1950s in the second tier before successive relegations saw them drop back into the Fourth Division. County won promotion as runners-up in 1959–60. They returned to the fourth tier by 1964, but were promoted as champions in the 1970–71 season, before securing promotion out of the Third Division under the stewardship of Jimmy Sirrel in 1972–73. They made their return to the top flight by finishing as runners-up of the Second Division in 1980–81. County were relegated after a three-season stay, and ended the decade back in the third tier, before Neil Warnock masterminded play-off successes in 1990 and 1991 that saw them promoted back into the top flight. However they were immediately relegated, thus missing out on the first-ever season of Premier League football. They fell back into the basement division by 1997–98, but managed to finish the season as champions. Following a financial crisis they were relegated again in 2004, before they won the League Two title in 2009–10 amid a takeover bid from a Middle Eastern consortium that eventually fell through despite great publicity and initial expectations. County were relegated back to the bottom tier at the end of the 2014–15 season, and remained there until the end of the 2018–19 season, when they were relegated from the Football League for the first time.

History

Beginnings 1862–1942 
Notts County has, for many years, claimed to be the oldest professional association football club in the world, having been
formed in 1862, although this is now disputed by Crystal Palace FC. The club predates The Football Association and initially played a game of its own devising, rather than association football. At the time of its formation, Notts County, like most sports teams, were considered to be a "gentlemen-only" club. Notts County are considered to be one of the pioneers of the modern game and are the oldest of the world's professional association football clubs (there are older professional clubs in other codes of football, and Sheffield F.C., an amateur club founded in 1857, are the oldest club now playing association football). In November 1872, the Notts County full-back Harwood Greenhalgh played for England against Scotland in the first-ever international match, thereby becoming the club's first international player. In 1888, Notts County, along with 11 other football clubs, became a founding member of The Football League. They finished their first league season in 11th place, but avoided the dubious honour of the wooden spoon, which went to Midlands rivals Stoke City. However, the club did achieve their highest ever league finish of third in 1890–91, an achievement they repeated 10 seasons later.

On 21 March 1891, Notts County played in the FA Cup final for the first time. The Magpies were defeated 3–1 by Blackburn Rovers at The Oval, despite having beaten the same side 7–1 in the league only a week earlier. County made up for this on 31 March 1894, when they won the FA Cup at Goodison Park, defeating Bolton Wanderers 4–1 in a game in which Jimmy Logan scored the second hat-trick in FA Cup final history. This achievement is also memorable for Notts County becoming the first club outside the top division to win the FA Cup: Notts County finished third in Division Two that season. In 1910 they moved to Meadow Lane. County were relegated in 1926 in what was to be their last season in the English top flight for over half a century. The 1925–26 season was the last season that famed giant goalkeeper Albert Iremonger played for the club. Legend among Notts County supporters it has been said he had "hands like the claws of a JCB and was a seven foot tall monster".

The club suspended all fixtures during the 1941–42 season after Meadow Lane was hit by enemy bombing.

Two golden ages 1945–1987 
In the 1946–47 season, the ground was used temporarily by Nottingham Forest after the River Trent flooded both Meadow Lane and the City Ground. Forest again used Meadow Lane in 1968, after fire destroyed the main stand at the City Ground. The 'golden age' of the club came just after the end of the Second World War. County stunned the footballing world by signing Tommy Lawton from Chelsea for a then-record fee of £20,000. Lawton's arrival increased crowds by over 10,000. One incident during this period saw 10,000 fans locked outside the ground. In the 1949–50 season, Notts County clinched the Third Division (South) championship. Crowds averaged 35,000 as The Magpies held off Nottingham Forest in a thrilling championship race. As the 1950s drew to a close, Nottingham Forest replaced Notts County as the city's biggest club. After the 1957–58 season, the two clubs did not play each other again in a League match for 16 years, until 26 December 1973.

The Magpies struggled during the 1960s, being on the brink of financial ruin and striving to avoid the indignity of having to apply for re-election to the league. This situation continued until Jack Dunnett, a local member of parliament, took control of the club. He appointed Jimmy Sirrel, a charismatic Scot who had once played for Celtic, as manager in November 1969. In the 1970–71 season County clinched the Fourth Division title in record-breaking style, remaining unbeaten at Meadow Lane. Two seasons later Notts County was again promoted, this time to Division Two. Sirrel departed for Sheffield United in October 1975 but returned two years later. He completed the remarkable transformation of Notts County in May 1981. He had turned The Magpies from Fourth Division strugglers to a top division side in little over a decade, ending an absence of 55 years from the top flight. This achievement was with the same chairman (Jack Dunnett) and trainer (Jack Wheeler) throughout the decade.

In one of the most famous moments in the club's modern history, Notts County visited newly crowned champions Aston Villa on the opening day of the 1981-82 season. The Villa team had paraded their 1980-81 League Championship trophy to an expectant crowd before kickoff, but against all odds, County came away with a 1–0 victory. After surviving relegation at the end of the season, Sirrel became the club's general manager, with his assistant Howard Wilkinson taking over as manager. County survived relegation a little more comfortably the following season, but Wilkinson was tempted away by the manager's job at his boyhood club, Sheffield Wednesday, and the board recruited former Wigan Athletic manager Larry Lloyd to replace him. Despite a good run to the quarter-finals of the FA Cup, where they were knocked out by eventual winners Everton, the club had a poor league campaign that ultimately resulted in their relegation. This poor form continued into the following season, resulting in Lloyd's dismissal with the club bottom of the Second Division. Richie Barker took over as manager, but failed to improve the club's fortunes, and was dismissed after less than six months in charge.

Jimmy Sirrel took charge of the team once again, and while the club's form improved, it came too late, and County suffered their second successive relegation. After two decent but unremarkable finishes in the Third Division, Sirrel finally retired in 1987, bringing to a close one of the most successful and memorable periods in Notts County's history.

Chasing the Premier League 1987–1995 
Sirrel was replaced by John Barnwell, who nearly steered the club to automatic promotion in the season that followed, but a late stumble meant they had to settle for the play-offs, where they lost to eventual winners Walsall. The team failed to repeat their form the following season and instead found themselves battling relegation to the Fourth Division, resulting in Barnwell being dismissed just before Christmas.

In late 1988, a new manager arrived. Neil Warnock had previously led Scarborough into the Football League as champions of the Football Conference. At the end of his first full season, Warnock had led Notts County to promotion back to Division Two. The club anthem The Wheelbarrow song originated during this season, stemming from the club's historic first game at Wembley Stadium in a 2–0 win over Tranmere Rovers. A famous 1–0 victory over Manchester City in the FA Cup booked them a place in the quarter-final, which they lost to eventual winners Tottenham Hotspur. Notts County also booked their second successive visit to Wembley and their second successive promotion. The Magpies defeated Brighton & Hove Albion 3–1 in front of 60,000 spectators, 25,000 of which were Notts County fans.

The following season was disappointing, seeing Notts County relegated from the top flight after just one season back there. Their first game of that season was a visit to Manchester United at Old Trafford, where they lost 2–0. However, they did manage to hold Manchester United to a 1–1 draw in the return game at Meadow Lane just after the turn of the year, as United began a dismal second half of the season which ultimately cost them the league title. County's relegation came shortly after the sale of strikers Paul Rideout and Tommy Johnson, which raked in nearly £2million in total and contributed towards a £5million stadium revamp which saw Meadow Lane rebuilt on three sides shortly afterwards. With the introduction of the Premier League, County were relegated from the old Division One to the new Division One. Warnock was dismissed in January 1993 and was succeeded by Mick Walker. Walker successfully averted a second consecutive relegation.

The Magpies narrowly missed the play-offs for promotion to the Premiership. The season is most remembered for a 2–1 victory over archrivals Nottingham Forest in which Charlie Palmer scored the winning goal with just four minutes remaining. Notts had led for much of the game, until Forest got a free kick from which they equalised. Notts fans were reluctantly resigning themselves to a draw, when Palmer headed in the winner. This was all the more remarkable because he only scored 4 goals in his whole career. The game has become a celebrated event among Notts County fans, who have dubbed 12 February (the anniversary of the game) Sir Charlie Palmer Day, and Charlie Palmer has been referred to as "Sir Charlie" by Notts fans ever since. In March 1994, Notts County lost the Anglo-Italian Cup final to Brescia.

Walker was surprisingly sacked in September 1994. This event triggered a dramatic decline in the club's fortunes that has persisted to the present. Notts won the Anglo-Italian Cup at Wembley in March 1995, but ended the season relegated to Division Two, with Walker, Russell Slade, Howard Kendall and Steve Nicol each taking control of the team at different times throughout the season, before the club appointed yet another manager, Colin Murphy after the season ended.

Mixed fortunes 1995–2008 
County made another visit to Wembley Stadium in the 1996 play-off final, but missed the chance of a return to Division One with a 2–0 defeat to Bradford City. The following season ranks among the club's worst, as they managed just seven victories all season and finished in the bottom position of the league table. Relegation to the league's basement division happened just six years after promotion to the top flight. However, success followed relegation under Sam Allardyce. The Magpies secured the Division Three title in March 1998 by a record margin of seventeen points. They became the first side since World War II to win promotion in mid-March, with six games still remaining.

Allardyce left in October 1999 to join his old team Bolton Wanderers. In September 2003, Notts County faced the real possibility of dissolution. Crippling debts and an increasingly impatient Football League board combined to leave the future of the league's oldest club in doubt. However, the considerable efforts of a group of local businessmen and the club's supporters helped save the club from extinction. But despite new ownership, the club were unable to avoid relegation back to the bottom division in 2004. In a similar circumstance as their relegation in 1992, due to the rebranding of the Football League, County went from Division Two to League Two.

Ian Richardson replaced Gary Mills as manager in November 2004. Richardson managed to guide the club away from the relegation zone and held the manager's job until the end of the season when Gudjon Thordarson became the club's sixth manager in five years. The 2005–06 season began well for the Magpies: they won or drew their first seven league games and were top of the table in September. But their form dropped and they escaped relegation only on the final day of the season with a 2–2 draw against Bury, whilst Oxford United lost and went down. The Magpies' 21st place in League Two, and 89th place overall, was the lowest position the club had ever finished, and at the end of the season both the chairman and the manager left, a long-standing youth squad programme was ended, and many of the first-team players were out-of-contract or nearing contract maturity.

Former assistant manager Steve Thompson was appointed as manager and he led the team to a 13th place division finish in 2006–07. The following season started with poor results, including early exits from the League Cup and the EFL Trophy, and Thompson was sacked in October 2007, to be replaced by Ian 'Charlie' McParland. However, the team's poor form continued and safety from relegation was only secured in the penultimate match of the season.

The 2009–10 season 

In June 2009, it was announced that County were in talks on a takeover by Munto Finance, a Middle Eastern consortium owned by Qadbak Investments and represented by Nathan and Peter Willett. Speculated by the British media and supported in part by various press releases, the club were believed to be given multimillion-pound backing, and were linked during the takeover's initial planning stages with the Qatari royal family by British tabloids. However, the latter claim was denied by the family. The supporters' trust, which owned the majority 60% share in the club, voted in favour of the takeover. On 14 July 2009, the takeover was confirmed, with Peter Trembling being appointed as executive chairman. A week later, former England manager Sven-Göran Eriksson was announced as the club's new director of football, having been persuaded by convicted fraudster Russell King to join Notts County. On 28 July 2009, the club unveiled a new logo.

The biggest headlines of the summer were made with the signings of England international defender Sol Campbell, and of goalkeeper Kasper Schmeichel. Schmeichel, a future Denmark international and Premier League winner, had just been released by Manchester City, and dropped a full three divisions to accept a five-year contract with County. Campbell, 34, moved from Premier League Portsmouth where he had been an FA Cup winner just eight months previously, but played only one game for County before walking out citing false promises. Schmeichel remained for the whole season, travelling with the squad to away games by private jet, but was never paid by the club, claiming in hindsight "it was all a farce" and "I knew something was wrong but I didn't care because I just wanted to play football".

On 20 October 2009, the League announced that County's owners had met its "fit and proper persons" regulations, and that while their structure was "complicated" and featured "both offshore entities and discretionary trusts", it had provided "extensive disclosure" to the League on their ownership structure. The League also stated that public disclosure of their ownership structure was a "matter for the club". McParland parted company with the club in October 2009 with Notts fifth in League Two and 4 points from the top of the table; youth team manager Michael Johnson and assistant manager Dave Kevan were installed as joint caretaker managers..

On 27 November 2009, The Guardian revealed that the league had reopened inquiries into the ownership of Notts County. The League chairman, Brian Mawhinney, confirmed that the club had been sent a series of questions relating to its ownership structure. On 12 December 2009, Peter Trembling purchased the club from Munto Finance for a nominal fee. Hans Backe, Eriksson's former assistant at Manchester City, was given the job of manager in October 2009. He signed a three-year deal and stated his intent to get the club promoted to League One, but resigned two months later after just nine games in charge.

Ray Trew bought the club in February 2010, after it had been served with two winding up petitions from HM Revenue and Customs due to demands for a late PAYE payment of around £500,000. After two months without a permanent manager, Steve Cotterill was given the Notts County job until the end of the 2009–2010 season in February 2010. Cotterill led the club to the League Two title after a 5–0 away win against the already-relegated Darlington, becoming the third club to win the fourth tier of English football three times. A month after winning the title, Cotterill stated that he would not be renewing his contract at Meadow Lane.

Falling out of the Football League 2010– 
A succession of short-term managers were able to keep the club afloat in League One. Ex-Notts County player Craig Short replaced Cotterill as Manager but was relieved of duties on 24 October 2010. Paul Ince took over in October 2010, then Martin Allen in April 2011, Keith Curle in February 2012, Chris Kiwomya in March 2013 after a short caretaker spell, and Shaun Derry in November 2013. Derry was able to turn the team's fortunes around and avoid relegation thanks to a 1–1 draw away at Oldham Athletic on the final day of the 2013–14 season.

County's luck ran out in March 2015, when Derry and assistant manager Greg Abbott were sacked with the team relegated to League Two. Ricardo Moniz joined on a three-year contract, but lasted only until 29 December 2015. Jamie Fullarton's reign was even shorter; appointed in January 2016 on a three-and-a-half year contract, but sacked in March after 12 games, during which time Ray Trew stepped down as chairman. Mark Cooper was Fullarton's temporary replacement, with the contract to be made permanent if a certain, undisclosed, amount of points total was achieved, but on 7 May Cooper left the club of his own volition.

Later that month John Sheridan left Oldham Athletic to become manager on a three-year contract. Sheridan was sacked in January 2017 for gross misconduct, following his verbal assaults and threats against match officials during the club's 2–0 home defeat by Wycombe Wanderers in December. On 7 January 2017, Notts County set a new club record of 10 successive defeats.

On 12 January 2017, Alan Hardy completed the takeover of the club from Ray Trew and appointed Kevin Nolan as manager, followed in August 2018 by Harry Kewell. Kewell left the club On 13 November 2018, to be replaced by Neal Ardley. On 27 January 2019, with County bottom of League Two, Hardy officially put the club up for sale, though not before attracting the attention of the FA for accidentally including a picture of his penis in a screenshot posted to Twitter. On 4 May 2019, following a 3–1 defeat away at Swindon Town, Notts County was relegated from the English Football League for the first time in their 157-year history. In the summer, the club was sold to Danish businessmen Alexander and Christoffer Reedtz.

Notts County came within 90 minutes of regaining their Football League status at the first attempt, losing 3–1 to Harrogate Town on 2 August 2020 in the National League promotion play-off final behind closed doors at Wembley Stadium.

In their next season, which was also their second consecutive season in the National League, they secured 5th place, which qualified them for the quarter-finals of the promotion play-offs. They beat Chesterfield 3–2 in the quarter-final. However, they lost 4–2 to Torquay United in the semi finals after extra time, thus keeping them in the National League for another year.

In the 2021–22 season, they finished fifth in the National League and reached the playoffs, but were knocked out by Grimsby Town in the quarter-final.  In the 2022–23 season, they were top of the league for most of the first half of the season.

Kit and badge
Notts County's first known colours were amber and black hooped shirts, dating from the 1870s. This was followed by short spells playing in amber, then chocolate and blue halves. In 1890, the club adopted black and white striped shirts, and have played in these colours for most of the rest of their history.

Juventus F.C. shirts
The Italian football club Juventus F.C. derived its famous black-and-white striped kits from Notts County. Juventus have played in black and white striped shirts, and with white or sometimes black shorts, since 1903. Originally, they played in pink shirts with a black tie, which only occurred due to the wrong shirts being sent to them. The father of one of the players made the earliest shirts, but continual washing faded the colour so much that in 1903 the club sought to replace them. Juventus asked one of their team members, Englishman John Savage, if he had any contacts in England who could supply new shirts in a colour that would better withstand the elements. He had a friend who lived in Nottingham, who being a Notts County supporter, shipped out the black and white striped shirts to Turin. Juve have worn the shirts ever since, considering the colours to be aggressive and powerful.

On 8 September 2011 to mark the opening of the new Stadium in Turin, Juventus invited Notts County for an historic exhibition match. After a spectacular opening ceremony referencing Juve's history, the game ended 1–1 with goals from Luca Toni and Lee Hughes both coming in the second half.

Stadium

 1862 – 1863 Park Hollow, The Park Estate
 1863 – 1873 Meadows Cricket Ground
 1873 – 1877 Trent Bridge Cricket Ground
 1877 – 1878 Beeston Cricket Ground
 1880 – 1894 Castle Ground
 1894 – 1910 Trent Bridge Cricket Ground
 1910 –  present Meadow Lane

The club initially played at Park Hollow in the grounds of the old Nottingham Castle. In December 1864, the decision was made to play games against outside opposition, and it was decided that the club needed to find a bigger venue. After playing at several grounds, including the Castle Ground, the Magpies settled at Trent Bridge Cricket Ground in 1883. However, when Trent Bridge was in use for cricket, Notts played matches at the Castle Ground or Nottingham Forest's Town Ground. The club moved to their current ground, Meadow Lane, in 1910. It currently has an all-seated capacity of 19,841 for Football League games. The record attendance is 47,310, who watched Notts lose 1–0 to York City in the FA Cup Sixth Round on 12 March 1955.

Supporters and rivalries

The Notts County Supporters Trust were the majority shareholders in the club between 2006 and 2009. When the club went into administration in 2003, and looked to be going out of business, the money to keep it in business was only found a week before the Football League's deadline. During this time, the supporters decided to form a supporters trust. In 2006 the trust eventually took control of Notts County Football Club, buying the club from Haydn Green. In 2009, members of the trust voted to accept a takeover bid from Munto Finance, with Peter Trembling named as Chairman. The group saw Sven-Göran Eriksson come in as Director of Football and Sol Campbell as a player. The club has a very large overseas following, with a large number of overseas fans mostly from Italy and Hungary, despite its relative lack of silverware; it was reported the number was one of the highest in The Football League.

Famous supporters include television and theatre writer William Ivory, musician Jake Bugg who sponsored the club in 2017, MP Kenneth Clarke (although he supports Forest as well) and infamously mass-murderer serial killer Harold Shipman.

Notts County view their main rivals as neighbours Nottingham Forest. However, during recent stints in the lower levels of the Football League, rivalry has increased with Nottinghamshire neighbours Mansfield Town. Other clubs sharing local rivalries with Notts County are Derby County, Lincoln City, Leicester City, and Chesterfield.

Honours and achievements

League 
Second Division/First Division/Championship (Tier 2)
Champions (3): 1896–97, 1913–14, 1922–23
Runners-up: 1894–95, 1980–81
Play-off winners: 1990–91
Third Division/Second Division/League One (Tier 3)
Runners-up: 1972–73
Play-off winners 1989–90
Third Division South (Tier 3)
Champions (2): 1930–31, 1949–50
Fourth Division/Third Division/League Two (Tier 4)
Champions (3): 1970–71, 1997–98, 2009–10
Runners-up: 1959–60

Cups 
 FA Cup
Winners (1): 1894
Runners-up: 1891
Anglo-Scottish Cup
Runners-up: 1981
Anglo-Italian Cup
Winners (1): 1995
Runners-up: 1994

Club records

As of the 2018–19 season, Notts County had played more league games (4,986) than any other English team, although following relegation to the National League this has subsequently been superseded by Preston North End.

League history

 L1 = Level 1 of the football league system; L2 = Level 2 of the football league system; L3 = Level 3 of the football league system; L4 = Level 4 of the football league system; L5 = Level 5 of the football league system.

 Seasons spent at Level 1 of the football league system: 30
 Seasons spent at Level 2 of the football league system: 37
 Seasons spent at Level 3 of the football league system: 34
 Seasons spent at Level 4 of the football league system: 18
 Seasons spent at Level 5 of the football league system: 3

With a total of 13 promotions and 17 relegations, no club has moved between the divisions of the Football League on more occasions than Notts County.

Promotion years:
1897
1914
1923
1931
1950
1960
1971
1973
1981
1990
1991
1998
2010

Relegation years:
1893
1913
1920
1926
1930
1935
1958
1959
1964
1984
1985
1992
1995
1997
2004
2015
2019

Most appearances

Most goals

Players

Current squad

Players of the season
As voted for by supporters of the club.

Club management

Coaching staff

Managerial history

References

External links

Club History
Notts County Official Website
NCFCOSA (Official Supporters' Association)

 
Articles with hCards
Association football clubs established in 1862
Football clubs in England
Former English Football League clubs
National League (English football) clubs
The Football League founder members
FA Cup winners
1862 establishments in England